is a Japanese footballer currently playing as a defender for Ehime FC.

Career statistics

Club
.

Notes

References

External links

2001 births
Living people
Sportspeople from Niigata Prefecture
Association football people from Niigata Prefecture
Japanese footballers
Association football defenders
J2 League players
Ehime FC players